This is a list of Qatari football transfers for the 2011–12 winter transfer window by club. Only transfers of clubs in the Qatar Stars League are included.

The summer transfer window opened on 1 January 2012, although some transfers took place prior to that date. The window closed at midnight on 31 January 2012. Players without a club may join one at any time, either during or in between transfer windows.

Qatar Stars League

Al Ahli

In:

Out:

Al-Arabi

In:

Out:

Al-Gharafa

In:

Out:

Al Kharitiyath

In:

Out:

Al-Khor

In:

Out:

Al Rayyan

In:

Out:

Al Sadd

In:

Out:

Al-Wakrah

In:

Out:

El Jaish

In:

Out:

Lekhwiya

In:

	

Out:

Qatar SC

In:

Out:

Umm Salal

In:

Out:

References

Qatari
2011–12 in Qatari football
Lists of Qatari football transfers